The Very Reverend is an honorific style given to higher-ranking members of a clergy. The definite article "the" should always precede "Reverend" when used before a name (e.g., the Very Rev. John Smith), because "Reverend" is an honorific adjective, not a title.

Catholic
In the Catholic Church, the style is given, by custom, to priests who hold positions of particular note. These include: vicars general, episcopal vicars, judicial vicars, ecclesiastical judges, vicars forane (deans or archpriests), provincials of religious orders, rectors or presidents of cathedrals, seminaries or colleges/universities, priors of monasteries, or canons. Monsignors of the grade of Chaplain of His Holiness are styled as the Very Reverend Monsignor, while honorary prelates and protonotary apostolics are styled the Right Reverend Monsignor. Now, apart from legitimate custom or acquired right, newer monsignors are simply styled The Reverend Monsignor. The style is also accorded in the Dominican Order to holders of the title of Master of Sacred Theology.

Eastern Orthodox
In the Eastern Orthodox churches, the style is used for archimandrites, protopresbyters and unmarried parish priests, while married priests are typically styled The Reverend.

Anglican
In the Anglican Communion, the style is used with certain senior priests in a diocese. The senior priest of a cathedral, whether a dean or a provost, is usually styled as the Very Reverend regardless of whether the priest is also the rector of the cathedral parish, or whether the cathedral is a parish church. In the Episcopal Church USA, the dean of a seminary or divinity school is also styled in this form, as is the priest who is either appointed by the local bishop or elected by fellow priests as the leader of a deanery, which is a geographic subdivision of a diocese. In some Episcopal dioceses convocation is used in lieu of deanery. The deans of dioceses in the Scottish Episcopal Church (who do not head a cathedral chapter) and the Anglican Church of Canada (who do) are also styled as the Very Reverend.

Presbyterian

In some mainline Protestant churches with a Presbyterian heritage, the style is used for former Moderators of the General Assembly, such as:
 a former Moderator of the United Church of Canada who is an ordained minister (as laypeople can also be elected to the position of moderator)
 a former Moderator of the Presbyterian Church in Ireland
 a former Moderator of the General Assembly of the Church of Scotland

By custom, the Dean of the Chapel Royal, the Dean of the Thistle and (if a Church of Scotland minister) the principal of St Mary's College, St Andrews, are also styled The Very Reverend.

See also

 The Reverend
 The Right Reverend
 The Most Reverend

References

Ecclesiastical styles